Banco di Desio e Brianza SpA is an Italian bank with headquarters in Desio (MB). It works basically in the north of Italy but also in other regions like Lazio, Veneto and Tuscany. 
It offers online services in addition to physical location access.

Founded in 1909 by engineer Egidio Gavazzi took the name Banco Desio in 1926. Incorporating the Bank of Brianza in 1967 increased presence on the Italian markets, bringing it to 21 branches. In 1995 it was listed on the Milan Stock Exchange. 

As of September 2015 it was included in FTSE Italia Mid Cap Index.

References

Banks of Italy
Banks established in 1909
Companies listed on the Borsa Italiana